The Arboretum de Puéchagut is an arboretum located near Bréau-et-Salagosse, Gard, Languedoc-Roussillon, France. It is open daily without charge.

The arboretum was created in 1890 by Charles Henri Marie Flahault (1852–1935) and Georges Fabre as an experimental station for studying the reforestation of the Forêt Domaniale de l'Aigoual with exotic species. It contains hiking paths and mature trees including araucaria and Sequoiadendron giganteum

See also 
 List of botanical gardens in France

References 
 Languedoc Roussillon, Michelin Editions du voyage, 2007, page 103. .
 Patrimoine Naturel & Culturel, Comité Départemental du Tourisme du Gard, 2008, page 35.
 France, le trésor des régions (French)

Gardens in Gard
Puéchagut